NGC 118 is a spiral galaxy of type S(rs)a? pec with an apparent magnitude of 13.6 located in the constellation Cetus. It was discovered on September 23, 1867 by the astronomer Truman Safford.

See also 
List of NGC objects

References

External links 
 

0118
Cetus (constellation)
Spiral galaxies